Amir Imam (born November 5, 1990) is an American professional boxer who challenged once for the WBC super lightweight title in 2018.

Professional career

Imam vs. Granados 
Imam turned professional in 2011 and won 18 consecutive fights before getting stopped by Adrián Granados.

Imam vs. Ramirez 
He would go on to win his next 3 fights before earning his first world title opportunity against José Ramírez which he ultimately lost on points. The scorecards read 120-108, 117-111 and 115-113 in favor of Ramirez.

Imam vs. Molina 
On February 22, 2020, Imam fought Javier Molina. Imam was outpointed by Molina in an eighth rounder, losing 74-78 on two and 73-79 on the third scorecard.

Professional boxing record

References

External links 
 
Amir Imam - Profile, News Archive & Current Rankings at Box.Live

1990 births
Living people
Light-welterweight boxers
Sportspeople from Albany, New York
Boxers from New York (state)
African-American boxers
American male boxers
21st-century African-American sportspeople